Ocnerostoma friesei is a moth of the family Yponomeutidae. It is found in Europe and Japan. The species closely resembles Ocnerostoma piniariella.

The wingspan is 8–10 mm. The moth flies in two generations from April to May and again from August to October. .

The larvae feed on Scots pine.

Notes
The flight season refers to Belgium and The Netherlands. This may vary in other parts of the range.

External links
 waarneming.nl 
 Ocnerostoma friesei at UK Moths

Moths described in 1966
Yponomeutidae
Moths of Japan
Moths of Europe